Moss Lake Bog is an  site containing a  glacial kettle lake located in the town of Caneadea, New York, outside Houghton. Over time, sphagnum moss has grown over the open water, turning it into an acidic bog.  It is managed by The Nature Conservancy as part of Moss Lake Preserve, and was declared a National Natural Landmark in 1973.

Visiting
Moss Lake Bog is open to the public daily.  There is a trail which circles the lake and a boardwalk which lets you cross safely through the moss. Several types of carnivorous plants and over 75 species of birds have been sighted.

See also
List of National Natural Landmarks in New York

References

External links
The Nature Conservancy: Moss Lake Preserve
Arthur Einhorn Moss Lake Mohawk Controversy papers at Newberry Library

National Natural Landmarks in New York (state)
Nature Conservancy preserves in New York (state)
Protected areas of Allegany County, New York
Nature reserves in New York (state)